Eucalyptus bosistoana, commonly known as the coast grey box or Bosisto's box, is a tree that is endemic to south-eastern Australia. It has rough, flaky bark at the base of its trunk, smooth cream yellow or grey bark above and sometimes throughout, the smooth bark shed in ribbons. The adult leaves are lance-shaped to curved and the flower buds are arranged in groups of seven. The flowers are white and the fruit is a cup-shaped, barrel-shaped or hemispherical capsule.

Description 
The bark on the lower part of the trunk is thin, greyish brown, rough and flaky. The bark on the upper part of the trunk and on the branches is smooth, white, cream-coloured or grey and is shed in ribbons. Sometimes all the bark is smooth. Flowering mainly occurs from January to April and the flowers are white.

Taxonomy and naming
Eucalyptus bosistoana was first formally described in 1895 by Ferdinand von Mueller. The description was published in the Australasian Journal of Pharmacy. The specific epithet (bosistoana) honours Joseph Bosisto, who was one of the first in Australia to extract essential oils, especially eucalyptus oil.

Distribution and habitat
Coast grey box occurs in New South Wales and Victoria from as far north as the Wolgan Valley, west of Sydney and as far south as eastern Gippsland.
Eucalyptus bosistoana is seen growing with E. cypellocarpa, E. longifolia, E. paniculata, E. sideroxylon, Corymbia maculata, E. angophoroides, E. elata, E. muelleriana, E. globoidea and other trees such as Casuarina cunninghamiana.

Uses 
A significant timber species, resistant to termites though susceptible to lyctus borers. The interlocked grain timber is highly regarded for heavy engineering. Other uses include construction, piles, poles and sleepers. A durable timber of considerable weight, being 1100 kilograms per cubic metre.

References

bosistoana
Myrtales of Australia
Flora of New South Wales
Flora of Victoria (Australia)
Trees of Australia
Plants described in 1895
Taxa named by Ferdinand von Mueller